The 2016 Hokkaido Bank Curling Classic was held August 4–7, 2016 in Sapporo, Japan. It was the first event of the 2016–17 curling season. The total purse for the event was ¥ 850,000.

Canada's rinks swept the event, winning both titles. Karsten Sturmay defeated Wang Fengchun from China in the men's final and Chelsea Carey beat Gim Un-chi from South Korea in the women's championship game.

Men

Teams
The teams are listed as follows:

Round robin standings
Final round robin standings

Round robin results
All draw times are listed in Japan Standard Time (UTC+09:00).

Draw 1
Friday, August 5, 9:00 am

Draw 3
Friday, August 5, 4:00 pm

Draw 5
Saturday, August 6, 9:00 am

Playoffs
Source:

Semifinals
Saturday, August 6, 7:00 pm

Final
Sunday, August 7, 12:30 pm

Bronze medal game
Sunday, August 7, 12:30 pm

Fifth place game
Sunday, August 7, 12:30 pm

Seventh place game
Saturday, August 6, 7:00 pm

Women

Teams
The teams are listed as follows:

Round robin standings
Final round robin standings

Round robin results
All draw times are listed in Japan Standard Time (UTC+09:00).

Draw 2
Friday, August 5, 12:30 pm

Draw 4
Friday, August 5, 7:30 pm

Draw 6
Saturday, August 6, 12:30 pm

Playoffs
Source:

Semifinals
Saturday, August 6, 7:00 pm

Final
Sunday, August 7, 12:30 pm

Bronze medal game
Sunday, August 7, 12:30 pm

Fifth place game
Sunday, August 7, 12:30 pm

Seventh place game
Saturday, August 6, 7:00 pm

References

External links
Men's Event
Women's Event

2016 in Japanese sport
2016 in curling
International curling competitions hosted by Japan
Sport in Sapporo
August 2016 sports events in Asia